The economy of Poland is an industrialized, mixed economy with a developed market that serves as the sixth-largest in the European Union by nominal GDP and fifth-largest by GDP (PPP). Poland boasts the extensive public services characteristic of most developed economies. Since 1988, Poland has pursued a policy of economic liberalization but retained an advanced public welfare system. This includes universal free public healthcare and education (including tertiary), extensive provisions of free public childcare and parental leave. The country is considered by many to be a successful post-communist state. It is classified as a high-income economy by the World Bank, ranking 22nd worldwide in terms of GDP (PPP), 23rd in terms of GDP (nominal), and 23rd in the 2018 Economic Complexity Index. 

The largest component of Poland's economy is the service sector (62.3.%), followed by industry (34.2%) and agriculture (3.5%). Following the economic reform of 1989, Poland's external debt has increased from $42.2 billion in 1989 to $365.2 billion in 2014. Poland shipped US$224.6 billion worth of goods around the globe in 2017, while exports increased to US$221.4 billion. The country's top export goods include machinery, electronic equipment, vehicles, furniture, and plastics. Poland was the only economy in the EU to avoid a recession through the 2007–08 economic downturn. 

As of 2019, the Polish economy had been growing steadily for 28 years, a record high in the EU. This record was only surpassed by Australia in the world economy. GDP per capita at purchasing power parity has grown on average by 6% p.a. over the last 20 years, the highest in Central Europe. Poland's GDP has increased seven-fold since 1990.

History

Poland has seen the largest increase in GDP per capita (more than 100%) both among the former Eastern Bloc countries, and compared to  the EU-15 (around 45%). It has had uninterrupted economic growth since 1992, even after the financial crisis of 2007–2008.

Before 1989
This article discusses the economy of post-1989 Poland. For a historical overview see:
 Economy of the People's Republic of Poland (1945–1989)
 Economy of the Second Polish Republic (1918–1939)
 Economy of the Polish–Lithuanian Commonwealth (1569–1795)

1990-2009 
The Polish state steadfastly pursued a policy of economic liberalization throughout the 1990s, with positive results for economic growth but negative results for some sectors of the population. The privatization of small and medium state-owned companies and a liberal law on establishing new firms has encouraged the development of the private business sector, which has been the main drive for Poland's economic growth. The agricultural sector remained handicapped by structural problems, surplus labor, inefficient small farms, and a lack of investment. Restructuring and privatization of "sensitive sectors" (e.g. coal), has also been slow, but the foreign investments in energy and steel have begun to turn the tide. Also, reforms in health care, education, the pension system, and state administration have resulted in larger than expected fiscal pressures. Improving this account deficit and tightening monetary policy, with a focus on inflation, are priorities for the Polish government. Further progress in public finance depends mainly on the reduction of public sector employment, and an overhaul of the tax code to incorporate farmers, who currently pay significantly lower taxes than other people with similar income levels.

Since the 2009 financial crisis
Since the global recession of 2009, Poland's GDP continued to grow. In 2009, at the high point of the crisis, the GDP for the European Union as a whole dropped by 4.5% while Polish GDP increased by 1.6%. As of November 2013, the size of the EU's economy remains below the pre-crisis level, while Poland's economy increased by a cumulative 16%. The major reasons for its success appear to be a large internal market (in terms of population it is sixth in the EU) and a business-friendly political climate. The economic reforms implemented after the fall of socialism in the 1990s have also played a role; between 1989 and 2007 Poland's economy grew by 177%, faster than other countries in Eastern and Central Europe, while at the same time millions were left without work.

However, the economic fluctuations of the business cycle did affect Poland's unemployment rate, which by early 2013 reached almost 11%. This level was still below European average and has begun falling subsequently. As of October 2017, Poland's unemployment rate stood at 4.6% according to Eurostat.

Economic growth 
In the period from 1989 to 2018, Poland's GDP increased by 826.96% and it was the best result in Europe. In the same period, Ireland's GDP grew by 789.43%, Slovakia's by 783.83% and the Czech Republic by 549.47%. In 1990, the Polish national income amounted to USD 65.978 billion, and by 2017 it had increased to USD 524.5 billion. Achieving these results was possible thanks to the privatization of state-owned enterprises, the development of private entrepreneurship, but also the rapid increase in work efficiency and openness to foreign direct investments. In 2018, the Polish economy grew by 5.1% compared to 4.8% in 2017. Economic growth in the fourth quarter of 2018 in Poland amounted to 4.9% on an annual basis and compared to the third quarter, where GDP increased by 5.1%, it was slightly lower. During this period, investments increased by 6.7%, private consumption also increased by 4.3%, and domestic demand increased by 4.8%. The PMI index in January 2019 was 48.2 points. and was higher than in December 2018 when it amounted to 47.6 points.

Economic nationalism and Repolonisation
Since 2015, under the Law and Justice (PiS) government, Poland has seen a growing wave of economic nationalism, with state-owned PZU in 2015 agreeing to buy a 25.3-percent stake in Alior Bank; PZU, together with the Polish Development Fund, buying a 32.8% stake in  Bank Pekao by UniCredit in 2017; state-owned PKN Orlen merging with its fellow state-run utility Energa in 2020; Lotos in 2022 and further plans to take over smaller rival PGNiG. The minister also suggested Poland should have greater control over the economy.

Jarosław Kaczyński, leader of the Law and Justice party, said in 2022 that the Polish government might buy PKP Energetyka and Żabka convenience store from CVC Capital Partners.

Data 
The following table shows the main economic indicators in 1980–2021 (with IMF staff estimates in 2022–2027). Inflation under 5% is in green.

Labour market and wages

Unemployment in Poland became a major problem after the fall of socialism, although the economy previously had high levels of hidden unemployment. The unemployment rate then fell to 10% by the late 1990s and then increased again in the first few years of the 21st century, reaching a peak of 20% in 2002. It has since decreased, although unevenly. Since 2008 the unemployment rate in Poland has consistently been below European average.

The rate fell below 8% in 2015 and 3.2% in 2019 leading to a labor deficit.

Foreign trade and FDI
With the collapse of the rouble-based COMECON trade bloc in 1991, Poland reoriented its trade. As early as 1996, 70% of its trade was with EU members. Neighboring Germany is Poland's main trading partner today. Poland joined the European Union in May 2004. Before that, it fostered regional integration and trade through the Central European Free Trade Agreement (CEFTA), which included Hungary, the Czech Republic, Slovakia and Slovenia.

Poland is a founding member of the World Trade Organization. As a member of the European Union, it applies the common external tariff to goods from other countries including the United States. Poland's major imports are capital goods needed for industrial retooling and for manufacturing inputs. The country's exports also include machinery but are highly diversified. The most successful exports are furniture, foods, motor boats, light planes, hardwood products, casual clothing, shoes and cosmetics. Germany is by far the biggest importer of Poland's exports as of 2013. In the agricultural sector, the biggest money-makers abroad include smoked and fresh fish, fine chocolate, and dairy products, meats and specialty breads, with the exchange rate conducive to export growth. Food exports amounted to 62 billion złoty in 2011, increasing by 17% from 2010. Most Polish exports to the U.S. receive tariff benefits under the Generalized System of Preferences (GSP) program. Poland ranks in the top 20 in the world both in terms of exports and imports, recording a clear trade surplus.

Poland is less dependent on external trade than most other Central and Eastern European countries, but its volume of trade with Europe is still substantial. In 2011 the volume of trade (exports plus imports) with the Euro area as share of GDP was 40%, a doubling from the mid 1990s. 30% of Poland's exports are to Germany and another 30% to the rest of Europe. There has been substantial increase in Poland's exports to Russia. However, in August 2014, exports of fruits and vegetables to Russia fell dramatically following its politically motivated ban by Moscow.

Foreign direct investment (FDI) was at 40% of GDP in 2010, a doubling over the level in 2000. Most FDI into Poland comes from France, Germany and the Netherlands. Polish firms in turn have foreign investments primarily in Italy and Luxembourg. Most of the internal FDI is in manufacturing, which makes it susceptible to economic fluctuations in the source countries.

The UAE is Poland's largest trading partner in the Arab world.

The government offers investors various forms of state aid, such as CIT tax at the level of 19% and investment incentives in 14 Special Economic Zones (among others: income tax exemption, real estate tax exemption, competitive land prices), several industrial and technology parks, the possibility to benefit from the EU structural funds, brownfield and greenfield locations. According to the National Bank of Poland (NBP), the level of FDI inflow into Poland in 2006 amounted to €13.9 billion.

According to an Ernst & Young report, Poland ranks 7th in the world in terms of investment attractiveness. However, Ernst & Young's 2010 European attractiveness survey reported that Poland saw a 52% decrease in FDI job creation and a 42% decrease in number of FDI projects since 2008. According to the OECD (www.oecd.org) report, in 2004 Poles were one of the hardest-working nations in Europe. 2010 the World Economic Forum ranked Poland near the bottom of OECD countries in terms of the clarity, efficiency and neutrality of the legal framework used by firms to settle disputes.

Sectors

Production industries

Before World War II, Poland's industrial base was concentrated in the coal, textile, chemical, machinery, iron, and steel sectors. Today it extends to fertilizers, petrochemicals, machine tools, electrical machinery, electronics, car manufacture and shipbuilding.

Poland's industrial base suffered greatly during World War II, and many resources were directed toward reconstruction. The socialist economic system imposed in the late 1940s created large and unwieldy economic structures operated under a tight central command. In part because of this systemic rigidity, the economy performed poorly even in comparison with other economies in Central Europe.

In 1990, the Tadeusz Mazowiecki government began a comprehensive reform programme to replace the centralised command economy with a market-oriented system. While the results overall have been impressive, many large state-owned industrial enterprises, particularly the rail, mining, steel, and defence sectors, have remained resistant to change and the downsizing required to survive in a market-based economy.

Energy

Pharmaceuticals
The total value of the Polish pharmacy market in 2008 was PLN 24.1bn, 11.5% more than in 2007.

The non-prescription medicines market, which accounts for about one-third of the total market value, was worth PLN 7.5bn in 2008. This value includes drugs and non-drugs such as dietary supplements, cosmetics, dressings, dental materials, diagnostic tests and medical devices. The prescription medicines market was worth PLN 15.8bn.

Mining
In 2019, the country was the 3rd largest world producer of rhenium; 5th largest producer of silver in the world; the 12th largest producer of copper; the world's 14th largest producer of sulfur; in addition to being the world's 14th largest producer of salt.

Agriculture

Agriculture employs 8.2% of the workforce but contributes 3.8% to the gross domestic product (GDP), reflecting relatively low productivity. Unlike the industrial sector, Poland's agricultural sector remained largely in private hands during the decades of real socialist [sic] rule. Most of the former state farms are now leased to farmer tenants. Lack of credit is hampering efforts to sell former state farmland. Currently, Poland's 2 million private farms occupy 90% of all farmland and account for roughly the same percentage of total agricultural production. Farms are small—8 hectares on average—and often fragmented. Farms with an area exceeding 15 ha accounted for 9% of the total number of farms but cover 45% of total agricultural area. Over half of all farm households in Poland produce only for their own needs with little, if any, commercial sales.

Poland is a net exporter of processed fruit and vegetables, meat, and dairy products. Processors often rely on imports to supplement domestic supplies of wheat, feed grains, vegetable oil, and protein meals, which are generally insufficient to meet domestic demand. However, Poland is the leading EU producer of potatoes and rye and is one of the world's largest producers of sugar beets and triticale. Poland also is a significant producer of rapeseed, grains, hogs, and cattle. Poland is the sixth-largest producer and exporter of apples in the entire world.

Tourism

Poland, especially after joining the European Union in 2004, became a place frequently visited by tourists. Most tourist attractions in Poland are connected with natural environment, historic sites and cultural events. They draw millions of tourists every year from all around the world. According to Tourist Institute's data, Poland was visited by 15.7 million tourists in 2006, and by 15 million tourists in 2007, out of the total number of 66.2 million foreign visitors. In 2016 the number of arrivals to Poland amounted to 80.5 million. 17.5 million of this number are arrivals considered for tourism purposes (with at least one night's stay), making it the 16th most visited country in the world. The most popular cities are Kraków, Warsaw, Gdańsk, Wrocław, Łódź, Poznań, Szczecin, Lublin, Toruń, Sopot, Zakopane and the Wieliczka Salt Mine. The best recreational destinations include Poland's Masurian Lake District, Baltic Sea coast, Tatra Mountains (the highest mountain range of Carpathians), Sudetes and Białowieża Forest. Poland's main tourist offers consist of sightseeing within cities and out-of-town historical monuments, business trips, qualified tourism, agrotourism, mountain hiking (trekking) and climbing among others.

Financial sector
The Polish banking sector is regulated by the Polish Financial Supervision Authority (PFSA).

While transforming the country to a market-oriented economy during 1992–97, the government privatized some banks, recapitalized the rest and introduced legal reforms that made the sector competitive. These reforms, and the health and relative stability of the sector, attracted a number of strategic foreign investors. At the beginning of 2009, Poland's banking sector had 51 domestic banks, a network of 578 cooperative banks and 18 branches of foreign-owned banks. In addition, foreign investors had controlling stakes in nearly 40 commercial banks, which made up 68% of the banking capital. Banks in Poland reacted to the financial crisis of 2009 by restraining lending, raising interest rates, and strengthening balance sheets. Subsequently, the sector started lending again, with an increase of more than 4% expected in 2011.

Venture capital 

The segment of the private equity market that finances early-stage high-risk companies, with the potential for fast growth, 130 active firms in Poland (as of March 2019). Between 2009 and 2019, these entities have invested locally in over 750 companies, an average of 9 companies per portfolio. Since 2016, new legal institutions have been established for entities implementing investments in enterprises in the seed or startup phase. In 2018, venture capital funds invested  in Polish startups (0.033% of GDP). The total value of investments of the Polish VC market is worth .

Transportation

Poland is served by an extensive network of railways. In most cities, the main railway station is located near a city centre and is well connected to the local transportation system. The infrastructure is operated by Polish State Railways, part of state-run PKP Group. The rail network is very dense in western and northern Poland, while the eastern part of the country is less developed. The capital city, Warsaw, has the country's only rapid transit system: the Warsaw Metro.

Poland's busiest airport is the Warsaw Chopin Airport. Warsaw Chopin serves as the main international hub for Poland's flag carrier LOT Polish Airlines. In addition to Warsaw Chopin, Wrocław, Gdańsk, Katowice, Kraków and Poznań all have international airports. In preparation for the Euro 2012 football championships jointly hosted by Poland and Ukraine, a number of airports around the country were renovated and redeveloped. This included the building of new terminals with an increased number of jetways and stands at both Copernicus Airport in Wrocław and Lech Wałęsa Airport in Gdańsk.

Poland has 412,264 km (256,170 mi) of public roads. Polish public roads are categorized by administrative division, which include national roads, voivodeship roads, Powiat roads and Gmina roads. Motorways and expressways are part of the national road network. As of January 2020, there are 4000 km of motorways and expressways in use.

Major companies in Poland

Selection of major Polish companies including from the list of 500 largest companies in Poland compiled by magazine Polityka:

Currency

Budget and debt

The public and private debt levels of Poland are below the European average (2017).

GDP growth in Poland
 
Recent GDP growth (comparing to the same quarter of previous year):

Location 
Poland has a very good location for transporting locally made components or products to the rest of Europe. For example, when moving production from China, the new factory in Poland can move their goods in 24 hours to most populated parts of Europe, and in 48 hours to all Europe.

The potential of Polish economy in the EU 
Poland, measured by the purchasing power parity index, is the sixth-largest economy in the European Union and the eighth-largest economy in Europe, slightly ahead of the Netherlands.

Poland recorded GDP growth even during the 2008–09 financial crisis. More than half of Poles who are economically active have a job (56%).

Although the Polish economy is catching up with the countries of Western Europe, this process is progressing slowly. So far, taking into account the level of social development, Poland has managed to overtake Portugal. There is a great deal of variation between regions. Masovian voivodeship is on a similar level to the richest regions of Spain and most regions of France (82% of the EU average). However, it should be remembered that the GDP of this voivodeship is mainly generated by Warsaw. Lower Silesian voivodeship with a GDP of $16,000 is on par with Portugal and the regions of Spain and Greece. Subsequent voivodeships reached about 50% of the EU average, and the poorest voivodships of the eastern wall have GDP per capita comparable to Romania and Bulgaria.

Polish capital has several large concerns in this region of Europe, i.e. PKN Orlen, which has its stations in Germany and Lithuania, Polsat, which also invests in Lithuania, the ITI Group. Poland has a highly developed road network, most of the A1, A2, A4 highways and expressways, including S6 and S7, are fully completed. The next ones are to be ready by 2023. Their construction by private companies is financed in part by the European Union. In the coming years, Poland is to receive approximately EUR 4.5 billion for the modernization of railways.

Poland is one of the key immigration destinations in the EU, having attracted more non-EU immigrants than any other EU country for a few consecutive years.

International rankings

35th in Human Development Index (2019)
26th in Inequality-adjusted Human Development Index (2019)
25th in Average Wage Index (2020)
50th in Democracy Index (2020)
10th in Henley Passport Index (2022)
27th in OECD Better Life Index (2020)
23rd in Human Capital Index (2020)
20th in Quality of Nationality Index (2018)
36th in Legatum Prosperity Index (2021)
31st in Social Progress Index (2020)
16th in EF English Proficiency Index (2021)
40th in Ease of Doing Business (2020)
23rd in Economic Complexity Index (2018)
37th in Global Competitiveness Report (2019)
39th in Index of Economic Freedom (2022)
25th in Global Peace Index (2022)
42nd in Corruption Perceptions Index (2021)

See also
 List of Polish voivodeships by GDP per capita
 List of Polish voivodeships by Human Development Index
 Poland A and B
 Warsaw Stock Exchange
 National Bank of Poland
 Education in Poland
 Science and technology in Poland
 Tourism in Poland
 Taxation in Poland
 Trade unions in Poland
 Poverty in Poland
 Economy of the European Union

References

 Worldmark Encyclopedia of National Economics, Volume 4 – Europe, Gale Group, 2002, 
 Economic data from Eastern European Markets (ceeMarket.com)

External links
 www.paiz.gov.pl 
 Attractiveness Europe 2007
 
 Articles on Polish economy in Central and Eastern European Packaging magazine
 OECD's Poland country Web site and OECD Economic Survey of Poland
 Business Portal for Poland 
 World Bank Summary Trade Statistics Poland
 Tariffs applied by Poland as provided by ITC's ITC Market Access Map, an online database of customs tariffs and market requirements

 
Poland
Poland
Poland
Poland